Mobi Banka, formerly known as Telenor Banka, is a commercial bank based in Belgrade, Serbia. It was founded in 2014 upon the acquisition of KBC Banka in Serbia, by Telenor Serbia, one of the largest telecommunications operators in the country.

History
The banking licence was originally awarded to "Alco Banka" in 1996, and was in ownership of Serbian businessman Miroljub Aleksić. The bank later changed its name to "A Banka".

In June 2007, "A Bank" was sold to the Belgian KBC Group for 100 million euros. After the transaction, it changed name to "KBC Bank Serbia". The Belgian bank was present in Serbia from 2007 up until 2014, when they announced their retreat from the Serbian market. They made a deal with Société Générale Srbija to sell its portfolio to this bank, while the banking licence and the bank itself were sold to Telenor Group, which was already present in Serbia, as a telecommunications operator. Thus, Telenor banka was founded, and commenced its operations in September 2014.

In July 2017, a strategic partnership contract was signed between Telenor and the Bulgarian investment fund River Styxx, selling 85% of shares to River Styxx. Telenor would keep a 15% share in bank's ownership, retaining special ties between Telenor Serbia and the bank. However, the transaction was annulled by the National Bank of Serbia in February 2018, due to "non-fulfillment of the prescribed conditions established by the regulations of Serbia".

In October 2019, Telenor banka changed its name to Mobi Banka.

Market and financial data
According to the most recent consolidated annual financial report submitted to the Serbian Business Registry Agency, the company has 182 employees and posted an annual loss of RSD 1,317,786,000 (€10.98 million) for the calendar year 2016. At the end of 2016 Telenor banka's total assets reached RSD 11,119,778,000 (€92.660 million).

According to media reports, the bank has more than 330,000 clients.

See also
Other financial services operated by Telenor:
vcash, former e-wallet service in Malaysia
Telenor Microfinance Bank in Pakistan
 List of banks in Serbia
 List of companies of Serbia
 National Bank of Serbia
 Economy of Serbia

References

Banks of Serbia
Companies based in Belgrade
Serbian brands
Telenor